Warm River can refer to:

 Warm River, Idaho
 Warm River (story) - short story by Erskine Caldwell, included in We Are the Living (1933)